Michael David Lukas (born March 30, 1979) is an American author best known for his internationally bestselling novel, The Oracle of Stamboul, published by HarperCollins and translated into over a dozen languages. Michael's second novel, The Last Watchman of Old Cairo, was published by Random House in 2018 and received the Sami Rohr Prize as well as the National Jewish Book Award. He teaches at San Francisco State University.

His writing has been published in The New York Times, Wall Street Journal, and the San Francisco Chronicle. He has been a Fulbright Scholar in Turkey and a Rotary Ambassadorial Scholar in Tunisia. He has received fellowships from the National Endowment for the Arts, the Santa Maddalena Foundation, and the Bread Loaf Writers' Conference. Lukas has taught creative writing at 826 Valencia, The Writers' Studio at Stanford University, and the University of the Pacific.

Personal life and education
Lukas was born in 1979 in Berkeley, California, where he grew up with his four younger siblings.

Moving East to attend Brown University, Lukas studied comparative literature and then received a Master of Fine Arts degree from the creative writing program at the University of Maryland.

He currently lives in Oakland with his wife Haley and daughters Mona and Amira.

Bibliography

Awards 

 2018: National Jewish Book Award for The Last Watchman of Old Cairo
2019: ALA's Sophie Brody Medal for The Last Watchman of Old Cairo
2019: Sami Rohr Prize for The Last Watchman of Old Cairo

References

External links 
 

American male writers
Living people
1979 births
Jewish American writers
21st-century American Jews
San Francisco State University faculty
Writers from Berkeley, California